Gilbert Kaze (born 25 January 1992) is a Burundian professional footballer, who plays as a defender for AS Ali Sabieh/Djibouti Télécom in the Djibouti Premier League.

International career
He was invited by Lofty Naseem, the national team coach, to represent Burundi in the 2014 African Nations Championship qualification which a competition held in South Africa. He scored a deciding penalty over Sudan and took Burundi to the 2014 CHAN.

References

External links

Living people
1992 births
Sportspeople from Bujumbura
Burundian footballers
Burundian expatriate footballers
Burundi international footballers
Association football defenders
Simba S.C. players
Expatriate footballers in Rwanda
Expatriate footballers in Ethiopia
Expatriate footballers in Tanzania
Expatriate footballers in Djibouti
Vital'O F.C. players
Tanzanian Premier League players
AS Ali Sabieh/Djibouti Télécom players
Djibouti Premier League players
Burundian expatriate sportspeople in Djibouti